Richard Antonio Benítez Subeldia (born 30 October 1981) is a Paraguayan former professional footballer who played as a defender.

Honours

Player
Unión Española
 Primera División de Chile: 2005 Apertura

References
 
 

Living people
1981 births
Association football defenders
Paraguayan footballers
Paraguayan expatriate footballers
Sportivo Luqueño players
Santiago Wanderers footballers
C.D. Antofagasta footballers
Unión Española footballers
Club Guaraní players
Expatriate footballers in Chile